Big lake of Buni Jezercë is one of the largest lakes in the Albanian Alps found in the north of Albania. The area of the lake is almost five hectares.

References

Lakes of Albania
Accursed Mountains